Kennebec is a name of the Kennebec people, a North American native people.

Kennebec may also refer to:

Places

Canada
Kennebec, an area of Quebec represented in the Senate of Canada
Kennebec Lake, north of Ardendale in Central Frontenac Township, Ontario

United States
Kennebec, South Dakota
Kennebec County, Maine
Kennebec Pass, a pass through the La Plata Mountains on county road 124 north of Hesperus, Colorado
Kennebec River, Maine
Kennebec Township, Iowa

Other
Kennebec potato, a variety of potato